Omoadiphas is a genus of snakes in the family Colubridae. The genus is endemic to Honduras.

Species and geographic ranges
The following three species are recognized as being valid. Each is found in a different mountain range in a different department of Honduras.
Omoadiphas aurula  – Sierra de Omoa, Cortés Department
Omoadiphas cannula  – Sierra de Agalta, Olancho Department
Omoadiphas texiguatensis  – Cordillera Nombre de Dios, Yoro Department

References

Further reading
Köhler G, Wilson LD, McCranie JR (2001). "A new genus and species of colubrid snake from the Sierra de Omoa of northwestern Honduras (Reptilia, Squamata)". Senckenbergiana biologica  81: 269–276. (Omoadiphas, new genus; O. aurula, new species). 
McCranie JR (2015). "A checklist of the amphibians and reptiles of Honduras, with additions, comments on taxonomy, some recent taxonomic decisions, and areas of further studies needed". Zootaxa 3931 (3): 352–386.

Omoadiphas
Snake genera
Taxa named by Gunther Köhler